Coleophora infuscatella is a moth of the family Coleophoridae. It is found in the United States, including Pennsylvania.

The larvae feed on the leaves of Phlox species. They create a trivalved, tubular silken case.

References

infuscatella
Moths described in 1860
Moths of North America